Martim Galvão (born July 7, 1995) is a Portuguese soccer player.

Career

College and amateur
Galvão was born in Lisbon, Portugal. He played his college career at Pfeiffer Falcons, where he played mainly as a playmaking midfielder. Galvão scored 22 goals and had 45 assists in 67 matches for the Falcons. His best match came in a 5-0 victory over North Greenville on October 11, 2014, when he scored a hattrick and provided 2 assists.

Galvão played in 13 of 14 matches with Nashville SC's U-23 side in PDL during the summer of 2017, scoring 7 goals and providing 4 assists.

Professional
On January 23, 2018, Nashville SC announced Galvão as the club's 21st signing. He made no competitive appearances for Nashville before being released on August 31, 2018. On September 17, 2018, Galvão signed a one-season contract with Thoi Lakatamias FC in the Cypriot Second Division.

References

Living people
1995 births
Pfeiffer Falcons men's soccer players
Ocean City Nor'easters players
Nashville SC (2018–19) players
USL League Two players
Association football midfielders
Portuguese footballers
Footballers from Lisbon